Friedrich Dürrenmatt (5 January 1921 – 14 December 1990) was a Swiss author and dramatist. He was a proponent of epic theatre whose plays reflected the recent experiences of World War II. The politically active author's work included avant-garde dramas, philosophical crime novels, and macabre satire. Dürrenmatt was a member of the Gruppe Olten, a group of left-wing Swiss writers who convened regularly at a restaurant in the city of Olten.

Life
Dürrenmatt was born in Konolfingen, canton of Bern, the son of a Protestant pastor. His grandfather, Ulrich Dürrenmatt, was a conservative politician. The family moved to Bern in 1935. Dürrenmatt began studies in philosophy, German philology, and German literature at the University of Zürich in 1941, but moved to the University of Bern after one semester where he also studied natural science. In 1943, he decided to become an author and dramatist and dropped his academic career. In 1945–46, he wrote his first play It Is Written. On 11 October 1946, he married the actress Lotti Geissler. 

Dürrenmatt traveled in 1969 to the United States, in 1974 to Israel, and in 1990 to Auschwitz in Poland.

In 1975 he played himself in the film End of the Game.

Dürrenmatt also enjoyed painting. Some of his own works and his drawings were exhibited in Neuchâtel in 1976 and 1985, as well as in Zürich in 1978.

His wife Lotti Geissler died on 16 January 1983. Dürrenmatt married another actress, Charlotte Kerr, in 1984.

In 1990, he gave two famous speeches, one in honour of Václav Havel ("Die Schweiz, ein Gefängnis?/Switzerland a Prison?"), upon discovering he had been spied on for five decades, along with 800,000 of his left-leaning fellow citizens, by the Swiss secret service; the other in honour of Mikhail Gorbachev ("Kants Hoffnung/Kant's Hope"). Dürrenmatt often compared the three Abrahamic religions and Marxism, which he also saw as a religion.

Dürrenmatt died from heart failure on 14 December 1990 in Neuchâtel.

Since 2000 his works are exhibited in Centre Dürrenmatt, a part of the Swiss National Library.

Dramatic works
Like Bertolt Brecht, Dürrenmatt explored the dramatic possibilities of epic theatre. Next to Brecht, he has been called its "most original theorist".

When he was 26, his first play, It Is Written, premiered to great controversy. The story of the play revolves around a battle between a sensation-craving cynic and a religious fanatic who takes scripture literally, all of this taking place while the city they live in is under siege. The play's opening night in April 1947, caused fights and protests in the audience. Between 1948 and 1949, Dürrenmatt wrote several segments and sketches for the anti-Nazi Cabaret Cornichon in Zürich; among these, the single-act grotesque short play Der Gerettete (The Rescued).

His first major success was the play Romulus the Great. Set in the year A.D. 476, the play explores the last days of the Roman Empire, presided over, and brought about by its last emperor, Romulus. The Visit (Der Besuch der alten Dame, 1956) is a grotesque fusion of comedy and tragedy about a wealthy woman who offers the people of her hometown a fortune if they will execute the man who jilted her years earlier. The satirical drama The Physicists (Die Physiker, 1962), which deals with issues concerning science and its responsibility for dramatic and dangerous changes to the world, has also been presented in translation.

Radio plays published in English include Hercules in the Augean Stables (Herkules und der Stall des Augias, 1954), Incident at Twilight (Abendstunde im Spätherbst, 1952) and The Mission of the Vega (Das Unternehmen der Wega, 1954). The two late works Labyrinth and Turmbau zu Babel are a collection of unfinished ideas, stories, and philosophical thoughts.

Selected bibliography
Es steht geschrieben (1947)
Der Blinde (1947)
Romulus the Great: An Ahistorical Historical Comedy in Four Acts (Romulus der Große, 1950, play)
The Judge and His Hangman (Der Richter und sein Henker, 1950; novel)
Suspicion (Der Verdacht, 1951, also known as The Quarry)
"The Tunnel" ("Der Tunnel", 1952; short story)
The Marriage of Mr. Mississippi (Die Ehe des Herrn Mississippi, 1952, play)
An Angel Comes to Babylon (Ein Engel kommt nach Babylon, 1953, play)
"Theatre Problems" ("Theaterprobleme", 1954, essay)
Once a Greek (Grieche sucht Griechin, 1955, novel)
The Visit (Der Besuch der alten Dame, 1956, play)
A Dangerous Game (Die Panne, 1956, novel / novella, also known as Traps)
The Pledge: Requiem for the Detective Novel (Das Versprechen: Requiem auf den Kriminalroman, 1958, novella)
The Physicists: A Comedy in Two Acts (Die Physiker, 1962, play)
Der Meteor (1966)
King John (König Johann, 1968, play)
Play Strindberg (1969, play)
Monster Lecture on Justice and Law, with a Helvetian Interlude (Monstervortrag, 1969, lecture)
The Coup ("Der Sturz", 1971, short story)
Achterloo (1982)
The Execution of Justice (Justiz, 1985)
The Assignment (Der Auftrag, 1986, novella)
"Switzerland—A Prison: A Speech for Vaclav Havel" ("Die Schweiz—ein Gefängnis. Rede auf Vaclav Havel", 1990, speech)

Dürrenmatt's stories in film
It Happened in Broad Daylight (1958), with a TV version made in 1997
The Marriage of Mr. Mississippi (1961)
The Visit (1964, Der Besuch der alten Dame)
Once a Greek (1966)
Der Meteor (1968)
Play Strindberg (1969), based on Strindberg's The Dance of Death
 Shantata! Court Chalu Aahe (Silence! The Court Is in Session) (1971), based on A Dangerous Game (also known as Die Panne (Traps))
Последнее дело комиссара Берлаха (Inspector Bärlach Last Case, based on Der Verdacht) (1971, in Russian)
La più bella serata della mia vita (1972, by Ettore Scola, based on La Panne)
Авария (The Breakdown, based on Die Panne) (1974, in Russian)
End of the Game (1976), based on The Judge and His Hangman, and in which Dürrenmatt himself appears in two scenes
The Deadly Game (1982, Trapp) based on A Dangerous Game
Cumartesi Cumartesi (1984, Salam, stories in film)
Физики (The Physicists) (1988, in Russian)
Визит дамы (The Visit of the Lady) (1989, in Russian)
Szürkület (Twilight) (1990, by György Fehér) based on the Es geschah am hellichten Tag movie script
Hyènes (1992), adaptation of The Visit by the Senegalese moviemaker Djibril Diop Mambéty
Jesienny wieczór (An Autumn Evening, based on Abendstunde im Spätherbst) (1992, in Polish)
Justiz (1993)
The Pledge (2001), based on the novel Das Versprechen, which is in turn based on the Es geschah am hellichten Tag movie script
 Male Nilluvavarege (2015) Kannada movie is based on A Dangerous Game

Adaptations
His novel, A Dangerous Game (also known as Die Panne (Traps)) was adapted into a Marathi play, Shantata! Court Chalu Aahe (Silence! The Court Is in Session) by Indian playwright Vijay Tendulkar in 1967. The play has since then been performed in various Indian languages, and made into a film by the same name by Satyadev Dubey.

His play The Visit has been adapted and Indianised into a play called Miss.Meena by Chennai-based theatre group 'perch'. The Visit has also been adapted as a musical by Kander and Ebb.

His play "The Indicident At Twilight" has been adapted into a play called "Sann 2025" by Piyush Mishra.

References

Further reading
 Everett M. Ellestad, "Friedrich Dürrenmatt's Mausefalle (Mouse Trap)", The German Quarterly, 43, 4, 770–779, November 1970.
 Gerhard P. Knapp, "Friedrich Dürrenmatt: Studien zu seinem Werk", Poesie und Wissenschaft, XXXIII, Lothar Stiehm Verlag, Heidelberg, 1976.
Centre Dürrenmatt Neuchâtel

External links

Friedrich Dürrenmatt home page sponsored by the University of Chicago Press. Includes a 1969 interview with Dürrenmatt, his story "Smithy" and essay "Automobile and Railroad Nations," and essays on Dürrenmatt.
Radio drama by Friedrich Dürrenmatt 

 
1921 births
1990 deaths
People from Bern-Mittelland District
Swiss writers in German
Swiss dramatists and playwrights
Male dramatists and playwrights
Swiss male writers
Grotesque
Swiss male short story writers
Swiss short story writers
Schiller Memorial Prize winners
Georg Büchner Prize winners
20th-century dramatists and playwrights